Mauricio Fabio Hanuch (16 November 1976 – 26 May 2020) was an Argentine footballer who played as a right midfielder.

He amassed Argentine Primera División totals of 137 games and 14 goals over the course of eight seasons, representing five clubs in the competition. He also played professionally in three other countries.

Club career
Born in Ciudad Evita, Greater Buenos Aires, Hanuch started playing professionally with Club Atlético Platense, joining Club Atlético Independiente after five years. He was then bought by Portugal's Sporting CP, where he was used during the first year, serving consecutive loans as early as the second season and being ultimately released in July 2003. In his only season with the "Lions", he totalled 418 minutes of action as the Lisbon side ended an 18-year drought and won the Primeira Liga championship.

Subsequently, Hanuch returned to Argentina, playing for Club Olimpo, Talleres de Córdoba, Defensores de Belgrano and Club Atlético Nueva Chicago, with a Brazilian spell (Rio Branco Esporte Clube) in between. After six months in Albania, he returned to his first club Platense for the 2008–09 campaign, retiring at the age of 32 and becoming a sports agent.

Death
Hanuch died on 26 May 2020 aged 43 in Buenos Aires, due to stomach cancer. The previous decade he had been forced to undergo a kidney transplant, with the organ being donated by his sister.

References

External links
Argentine League statistics  

1976 births
2020 deaths
Sportspeople from Buenos Aires Province
Argentine footballers
Association football midfielders
Argentine Primera División players
Primera Nacional players
Club Atlético Platense footballers
Deportivo Morón footballers
Club Atlético Independiente footballers
Olimpo footballers
Talleres de Córdoba footballers
Defensores de Belgrano footballers
Nueva Chicago footballers
Primeira Liga players
Sporting CP footballers
C.D. Santa Clara players
CD Badajoz players
Rio Branco Esporte Clube players
Kategoria Superiore players
FK Dinamo Tirana players
Argentine expatriate footballers
Expatriate footballers in Portugal
Expatriate footballers in Brazil
Expatriate footballers in Spain
Expatriate footballers in Albania
Argentine expatriate sportspeople in Portugal
Argentine expatriate sportspeople in Brazil
Argentine expatriate sportspeople in Spain
Argentine expatriate sportspeople in Albania
Deaths from stomach cancer
Deaths from cancer in Argentina